Alessandro Carloni is an Italian film director, animator, and art director, best known for his work with DreamWorks Animation in general, particularly the Kung Fu Panda films. He co-directed Kung Fu Panda 3, alongside Jennifer Yuh Nelson.

Biography
Born in Bologna, Carloni spent his childhood in Urbino, a walled city and World Heritage site southwest of Pesaro, known for its remarkable legacy of independent Renaissance culture and for being the birthplace of Renaissance master Raphael Santi. But Carloni was not a young artist, at least not officially. Not even though his father worked as an illustrator for magazines, book covers and advertisements. "I was exposed to his work, but he never pushed me to be part of his studio," Carloni says. "He taught me many things. He wanted me to explore on my own." He became an artist almost despite himself. Carloni entered the University of Milan as a literature major, but to earn money, he began selling drawings. "I got little jobs through my friends to help pay for meals and money here and there," he says. "Small things like invitation tickets for clubs." Those little jobs helped change his future.  "It made me understand that my true passion was visual storytelling," he says. "I cared about that more than continuing my studies." A friend in Germany suggested he apply to Munich Animation, and soon Carloni was an in-betweener. "I drew all the tedious drawings," he says. But, that led to work as an animator, a story artist, a director, an art director, a character designer, a sculptor, and an animation supervisor for commercials, music videos, and feature films in Germany, Switzerland, and Denmark. Then, in 2000, he co-directed an award-winning animated short film through Munich Animation with writer-director Gabriele Pennacchioli. The studio envisioned the film, The Shark and the Piano, as a marketing tool. "It was still a time when American studios sent portions of their 2D feature films to Europe to produce," Carloni says, "so we decided to make a film to show what we could do." But, by the time they approached the American studios, those studios had turned their focus to 3D.

Since joining DreamWorks Animation in 2002, Carloni served as lead animator on Sinbad: Legend of the Seven Seas and Shark Tale, an animation supervisor on Kung Fu Panda, a story artist on Kung Fu Panda 2 and The Croods, and head of story on the first two How to Train Your Dragon movies and as a story artist on The Hidden World. For his work on Kung Fu Panda, he was nominated in the category Storyboarding in an Animated Feature Production at the 36th Annie Awards. In early 2012, Carloni was attached as a director to the computer-animated/traditionally animated film Me and My Shadow for DWA, replacing the original director Mark Dindal. By early 2013, the film had returned into development following massive lay-offs at DWA. By early 2015, Carloni had joined Jennifer Yuh Nelson to help her co-directing Kung Fu Panda 3 (2016), in order to meet its release dateline.

In 2017, he was hired by Skydance Media to direct an animated film, titled Luck, but left the project in early 2020 over creative differences. In 2017, it was also announced that he was co-directing  with Jean-Philippe Vine Locksmith Animation's first animated film, Ron's Gone Wrong, but, by early 2020, he had left the position.

Filmography

Nominations
 Best Storyboarding in an Animated Feature Production for How to Train Your Dragon (2010, Annie's)
 Best Storyboarding in an Animated Feature Production for Kung Fu Panda (2008, Annie's)

References

External links 
 Alessandro Carloni page

 Official Twitter Page

American directors
American animators
American animated film directors
American storyboard artists
Italian directors
Italian animated film directors
Italian animators
Living people
1978 births